Martti Sipilä (11 July 1915 – 10 April 2003) was a Finnish cross-country skier. He competed in the men's 50 km event at the 1948 Winter Olympics.

Cross-country skiing results

Olympic Games

World Championships

References

External links
 

1915 births
2003 deaths
Finnish male cross-country skiers
Olympic cross-country skiers of Finland
Cross-country skiers at the 1948 Winter Olympics
People from Hamina
Sportspeople from Kymenlaakso
20th-century Finnish people